The 2001–02 Southern Football League season was the 99th in the history of the league, an English football competition.

Kettering Town won the Premier Division and earned promotion to the Football Conference. Newport (Isle of Wight), King's Lynn, Merthyr Tydfil and Salisbury City were relegated from the Premier Division, whilst Hastings Town, Halesowen Town, Grantham Town and Chippenham Town were promoted from the Eastern and Western Divisions, the former two as champions. Wisbech Town were relegated to the eighth level and Bilston Town resigned and dropped to the ninth level, whilst Bloxwich United of the Western Division folded during the season and their record was expunged.

Premier Division
The Premier Division consisted of 22 clubs, including 17 clubs from the previous season and six new clubs:
Two clubs promoted from the Eastern Division:
Chelmsford City
Newport (Isle of Wight)

Two clubs promoted from the Western Division:
Hinckley United
Tiverton Town

Two clubs relegated from the Football Conference
Hednesford Town
Kettering Town

League table

Eastern Division
The Eastern Division consisted of 22 clubs, including 18 clubs from the previous season and four new clubs:
Two clubs relegated from the Premier Division:
Dorchester Town
Fisher Athletic

Plus:
Chatham Town, promoted from the Kent League
Rugby United, transferred from the Western Division

Also, Langney Sports changed name to Eastbourne Borough.

At the end of the season Hastings Town changed name to Hastings United.

League table

Western Division
The Western Division consisted of 22 clubs, including 17 clubs from the previous season and five new clubs:
Two clubs relegated from the Premier Division:
Clevedon Town
Halesowen Town

Plus:
Chippenham Town, promoted from the Western League
Stourport Swifts, promoted from the Midland Alliance
Swindon Supermarine, promoted from the Hellenic League

League table

See also
Southern Football League
2001–02 Isthmian League
2001–02 Northern Premier League

References

Southern Football League seasons
6